The first shopping centre in Norway was built in Bærum in 1953. New shopping centres came up in the 1960s and the 1970s, but the explosion of shopping malls didn't start before the end of the 1980s when Kvadrat, City Syd and several other large malls were built.

Norwegian shopping centres

References

 
Shopping centres
Norway